Lina Gennari (22 March 1911 – 11 October 1997) was an Italian actress and operetta singer.

Born Carolina Gennari in Bologna, she made her debut in the early 1920s in the Schwarz stage company, and she had her first role as prima donna in the operetta Al cavallino bianco. She achieved a large success in 1939 with the revue Se un'idea mi porta fortuna and then in 1940 with Nuto Navarrini's Vicino alle stelle. She appeared in several films between 1933 and 1955, notably playing the greedy landlady in Vittorio De Sica's Umberto D..

Filmography

References

External links 

 

Italian film actresses
Italian stage actresses
Actors from Bologna
1911 births
1997 deaths
20th-century Italian actresses